Thomas Madison (1746–1798) was a soldier, planter and politician in Revolutionary-era Virginia, who served several terms (part-time) in the Virginia House of Delegates representing Botetourt County, Virginia (whose seat is at Fincastle) after its creation from Augusta County in 1770.

He was born in Augusta County, Virginia, the son of John and Agatha (Strother) Madison; his brothers included Governor George Madison and the Reverend James Madison. He was a second cousin to United States President James Madison.

A patriot like his brothers during the American Revolutionary War, this Madison was one of the 13 signers of the Fincastle Resolutions in 1775. He served as sheriff of Augusta County and as a commissary during the 1776 expedition against the Cherokees. His wife was Susanna Henry, sister of Virginia governor Patrick Henry. The Virginia General Assembly created Botetourt County from Augusta County shortly before the war, and after independence, Botetourt County voters several times elected this Madison to represent them (part time) as one of their representatives in the Virginia House of Delegates.

References

1746 births
People from Augusta County, Virginia
People from Botetourt County, Virginia
Members of the Virginia House of Delegates
1798 deaths
Virginia sheriffs
Madison family
People of Virginia in the American Revolution
Virginia colonial people